Stephen Kasprzyk (born February 14, 1982) is an American rower. He competed in the Men's eight event at the 2012 Summer Olympics.

Born in Willingboro Township, New Jersey, Kasprzyk grew up in Cinnaminson Township, New Jersey. He graduated from Holy Cross High School as part of the class of 2000, and graduated in 2005 from Drexel University with a degree in chemical engineering.

References

External links
 

1982 births
Living people
American male rowers
Drexel University alumni
Holy Cross Academy (New Jersey) alumni
Olympic rowers of the United States
Rowers at the 2012 Summer Olympics
Rowers at the 2016 Summer Olympics
People from Cinnaminson Township, New Jersey
People from Willingboro Township, New Jersey
Sportspeople from Burlington County, New Jersey
Rowers at the 2011 Pan American Games
World Rowing Championships medalists for the United States
Pan American Games gold medalists for the United States
Pan American Games medalists in rowing
Medalists at the 2011 Pan American Games